Hail, Mary! is a 1970 Soviet drama film directed by Iosif Kheifits. It was entered into the 7th Moscow International Film Festival where Ada Rogovtseva won the award for Best Actress.

Plot
The film is set in 1919. In the vastness of the former Russian Empire a civil war rages on. In Europe, the World War has just ended and the winning countries are to organize a military intervention in Russia to help the White movement in the struggle against Soviet power.

In one of the southern ports come on board ships of the Entente troops, including those from Spain. The young underground fighter Maria gets the job to campaign among the Spanish sailors and soldiers. This is where she meets a sailor Pablo. Love starts to grow between them.

The Civil War is over. In Russia, Soviet power has taken hold. But here people dream of a world-wide revolution. After a long separation, Maria and Pablo meet again and together go to Spain as Comintern agents, to prepare a local revolution and at the same time to conduct intelligence activities there. They end up having a son.

But the happiness does not last long - the Nazis kill Pablo. In Spain, civil war erupts. Son of Mary, a fighter pilot, dies in a dogfight. Having lost her husband and son, Maria returns home, where she works as an instructor in a Soviet intelligence school.

Cast
Ada Rogovtseva as Maria Tkachyova
Angel Gutierrez as Pablo Luis Alvarez
Vitali Solomin as Seva Chudreev
Vladimir Tatosov as Ignacio Mures
Valentina Vladimirova as Maria's mother
Alexander Barinov as Pavlik, Paulito, son of Maria and Pablo, Soviet pilot-internationalist
Tatiana Bedova as Olya / Nadezhda Kosheverova, agent
Avgust Baltrusaitis
L. Bayon
Oleg Belov as Riccardo Rivas

References

External links
 

1970 films
1970 drama films
Soviet drama films
Russian drama films
1970s Russian-language films
Films directed by Iosif Kheifits